Justice Lake may refer to:

George B. Lake, associate justice of the Nebraska Supreme Court
I. Beverly Lake Jr., chief justice of the North Carolina Supreme Court
I. Beverly Lake Sr., associate justice of the North Carolina Supreme Court